Beni Khirane is a Moroccan tribe of Hilali-Arab descent, who settled in Morocco in the 12th century. The tribe is part of the Tadla Reconfederacy and Rif .

About 
The Beni Khirane tribe live in the Tadla region of Morocco. They form part of the greater Beni Hilal tribe who crossed to the Maghreb in the 10th century. They were introduced in Morocco during the eleventh century under the reign of the Almohad. They are mainly farmers who have largely preserved a Bedouin spirit.

See also 
 Arab tribes
 Maghreb
 Maghrebis
 North African Arabs

References

Arab tribes in Morocco